Michael Immanuel Rundio (born 21 January 1983 in Ulm) is a German footballer who plays for SV Lonsee. He spent three seasons in the Bundesliga with VfB Stuttgart and also played two games for the club in the UEFA Cup.

References

1983 births
Living people
German footballers
Germany youth international footballers
VfB Stuttgart players
VfB Stuttgart II players
SpVgg Greuther Fürth players
Sportfreunde Siegen players
TSG 1899 Hoffenheim players
Bundesliga players
2. Bundesliga players
Association football defenders
Sportspeople from Ulm
Footballers from Baden-Württemberg